Gian Nicola Berardi (born 21 February 1979) is a retired athlete from San Marino who specialised in the sprinting events. He represented his country at the 2004 Summer Olympics, as well as two outdoor and three indoor World Championships.

Apart from being a sprinter, he also represented San Marino in basketball.

Competition record

Personal bests
Outdoor
100 metres – 10.60 (+0.5 m/s) (Marsa 2003) NR
200 metres – 21.68 (+0.3 m/s) (Marsa 2003)

Indoor
60 metres – 6.87 (Ancona 2004) NR
200 metres – 25.57 (Eaubonne 2007)

References

1979 births
Living people
Sammarinese male sprinters
Olympic athletes of San Marino
Athletes (track and field) at the 2004 Summer Olympics
World Athletics Championships athletes for San Marino
Athletes (track and field) at the 2001 Mediterranean Games
Sammarinese men's basketball players
Mediterranean Games competitors for San Marino